The forkball is a type of pitch in baseball.  Related to the split-finger fastball, the forkball is held between the first two fingers and thrown hard, snapping the wrist.

The forkball differs from the split-fingered fastball, however, in that the ball is jammed deeper between the first two fingers. The result is that the forkball is generally thrown slightly slower than the splitter, but has more of a "tumbling" action akin to the movement of a 12–6 curveball, as it will drop off the plate before it gets to the catcher's mitt.

Use in the Major Leagues

The forkball has been favored by several current and former major league pitchers, including Tom Henke, Kevin Appier, Hideo Nomo, José Valverde, José Arredondo, Ken Hill, Justin Speier, Kazuhiro Sasaki, José Contreras, Chien-Ming Wang, Junichi Tazawa, Robert Coello, and Edwar Ramírez. Two-time Cy Young Award winner Tim Lincecum used a changeup with forkball movement as his strike-out pitch. Hall of Famer Gaylord Perry, winner of the Cy Young Award in both leagues, was arguably the greatest practitioner of the forkball.  In addition, a number of NPB players throw forkballs, including Kazumi Saito of the Fukuoka SoftBank Hawks, who has ridden his forkball to two Eiji Sawamura Awards. In actuality, the forkball is more popular than the splitter in Japan, and the majority of the best pitchers in Japan have one in their arsenal. Former Major League pitchers Dave Stewart and Mélido Pérez were two of the most highly regarded forkball pitchers in the late 1980s. Late in his career, the forkball was also used by Sandy Koufax. In his fourth MLB season (1980), Jack Morris learned the forkball from pitching coach Roger Craig, and it became his primary strikeout pitch while he won more games than any other pitcher in the 1980s. Roy Face and Lindy McDaniel were relief pitchers who pitched for 16 and 21 years, respectively, in the Major Leagues and were forkballers. Face started his career in 1953 and McDaniel in 1955.

Throwing mechanics
The forkball is thrown with the same arm motion and speed of a fastball, but at release point, the wrist is snapped downward. Additionally, allowing the ball to spin off the middle or index finger may result in additional movement.

Origin of the forkball

"Bullet" Joe Bush of the Boston Red Sox is credited with the invention of the forkball, shortly following World War I. However, it was popularized by former relief pitcher Elroy Face of the Pittsburgh Pirates.  Face single-handedly made the forkball a topic of popularized discussion through his effective use of the pitch.

Medical concerns
The forkball, if thrown correctly, is known to be a cause of significant and increasingly common damage to the shoulder and elbow.  Famous forkballers, particularly Japanese players, have often required surgery to repair bone fractures or damaged tendons, sometimes several times in their careers.  Younger players are discouraged from attempting to throw the forkball before reaching the age of 17–18. One such pitcher was former Yokohama BayStars and Seattle Mariners closer Kazuhiro Sasaki. However, these injuries are avoidable; if the pitcher does not snap his wrist in the motion, then the forkball theoretically should have no damaging effect to his arm. The only tradeoff is a slight decrease in speed; the pitch should still break the same way.

References

Baseball pitches